Byford railway station is located on the South Western Railway in Western Australia. It serves the south-eastern Perth suburb of Byford.

History
The original Byford station was the terminus for selected services from Perth. It closed and was demolished in the late 1980s.

In the late 1990s, a new station was built as a calling place for The Australind.

Armadale Line Extension
As part of Metronet, it has been announced that Transperth's Armadale Line service will be extended to a new station in Byford, approximately 400 metres north of Abernethy Road. The station will include parking for up to 600 cars, a new bus interchange and a pedestrian connection across the rail line. Options for removing the level crossings along the rail between Armadale and Byford are also being considered as part of the project.

References

External links
Byford Station History of Western Australian Railways & Stations gallery

Railway stations in Perth, Western Australia
South Western Railway, Western Australia
Byford, Western Australia